Tir-Phil railway station is a railway station serving the village of Tir-Phil and the town of New Tredegar, south Wales. It is a stop on the Rhymney Line of the Valley Lines network. Work to extend the platform to take the proposed six car trains has now been completed.

History

Tir-Phil station was opened in 1858 by the Rhymney Railway on the line from Cardiff to Rhymney.

From 2014 (subject to rolling stock availability) the train service was due to become every 30 minutes from the current hourly frequency with the construction of a passing loop at this station and a second platform as part of the Cardiff area re-signalling scheme - the new loop & signalling were commissioned in September 2013. Arriva Trains Wales have said that they do not have the rolling stock to allow 30 minute services for the foreseeable future. The new second platform came into use on 9 September 2013, but the platform remained unfinished and no further work was done until August 2014.

The wall behind the new platform which retains the road embankment has been substantially rebuilt, and the platform has now been completed (late 2015). Work also restarted on installing a ramp on the old platform and this was first used by a mobility scooter using member of the public on the morning of 13 April 2017, some three and a half years later than originally expected.

Services
In the December 2016 timetable, the basic Mon-Sat daytime frequency is once per hour in each direction (with peak period extras, none of which are scheduled to pass in the loop here).

Notes

External links

Railway stations in Caerphilly County Borough
DfT Category F2 stations
Former Rhymney Railway stations
Railway stations in Great Britain opened in 1858
Railway stations served by Transport for Wales Rail